John Paul Cooper (born 1 November 1983) is an English singer and songwriter. He is best known for featuring on the Jonas Blue single "Perfect Strangers". The song was certified platinum in the UK. His follow-up solo single was "September Song". He is signed to Island Records.

Career

2002–2006: Access to Music
In 2002 JP Cooper studied Contemporary Popular Music at North Trafford College, based at Beehive Mill in Manchester.  There he joined a band called Kid Conspiracy, who later changed their name to Azure Glow.  They grew a small following locally and enjoyed limited success, releasing self made EPs including ‘December Falls’ and ‘Listen’.  They ultimately disbanded following their last UK tour in 2006.

2012–2015: Career beginnings
On 27 June 2012, JP Cooper released his first two extended plays EP1 and EP2. He featured on Don Diablo's single "The Artist Inside", it was released on 9 November 2012. He released his third extended play, EP3 on 8 February 2013. On 20 July 2014 he released his fourth extended play Keep the Quiet Out. He released his fifth extended play, When the Darkness Comes on 26 January 2015.

2016–present: Raised Under Grey Skies

On 18 March 2016, he released the single "Five More Days", featuring vocals from Avelino. He featured on Jonas Blue's single "Perfect Strangers", it was released on 3 June 2016. The song peaked at number 2 on the UK Singles Chart, and reached the top ten positions in eight additional countries, including Germany, Australia and Sweden. On 10 June 2016, he released the single "Party" as the lead single from his debut studio album. He released "September Song" on 16 September 2016 as the second single. The song peaked at number 7 on the UK Singles Chart, and also reached the top 10 in the Republic of Ireland and Sweden. "Passport Home" was released as the third single on 7 April 2017, peaking at number 86 on the UK Singles Chart. On 21 July 2017 he released "She's on My Mind" as the fourth single. "Wait" was released as the fifth single of his debut studio album on 25 August 2017. He eventually released his debut studio album, Raised Under Grey Skies on 6 October 2017. He was featured on Craig David's seventh studio album The Time Is Now on the song "Get Involved", that was released on 26 January 2018. On 16 June 2018, he played at Pinkpop, a festival in the Netherlands. On 26 July 2018, Cooper released "All This Love", featuring singer-songwriter Mali-Koa Hood. In August 2019, he collaborated with Gabrielle Aplin on her song "Losing Me" and in November that same year he collaborated with Stefflon Don. Cooper's second album, She, was released on 21 February 2022.

Discography

 Raised Under Grey Skies (2017)
 She (2022)

References

External links
 Official website

1983 births
Living people
21st-century English male singers
English male singer-songwriters
Island Records artists
Tropical house musicians
21st-century British male singers
People from Middleton, Greater Manchester
Musicians from Greater Manchester